Baghdad Ka Chor is a Bollywood film. It was released in 1946 directed by Nanubhai Vakil.

References

External links
 

1946 films
1940s Hindi-language films
Indian action adventure films
1940s action adventure films
Indian black-and-white films
Films directed by Nanubhai Vakil
Films set in Baghdad
Indian fantasy action films
Indian fantasy adventure films
Indian fantasy drama films
Films based on The Thief of Bagdad